Hulled wheat can refer to:

Einkorn, Triticum monococcum
Emmer, Triticum dicoccum
Spelt, Triticum spelta
Farro, any of the above